Sarkhej was one of the 182 assembly seats of Gujarat's Vidhan Sabha (Gujarat Legislative Assembly), from 1975 until 2012. It was a largely urban seat representing there  of Ahmedabad. Its abolition, along with others and new replacement seats were drawn up in 2008, in readiness for the next election which proved to be in 2012.

Members of Legislative Assembly
Sources:

Election results

2007

2002

See also
 Ahmedabad district
 List of constituencies of the Gujarat Legislative Assembly
 Naranpura (Vidhan Sabha constituency)
 Gandhinagar (Lok Sabha constituency)

References

Former assembly constituencies of Gujarat
Ahmedabad district